Norman Hargrave Taylor  (9 June 1900 – 25 October 1975) was a New Zealand teacher, soil scientist and scientific administrator. He was born in Auckland, New Zealand, in 1900. He was the director of the Soil Bureau and was appointed an Officer of the Order of the British Empire in the 1960 Queen's Birthday Honours.

The New Zealand Society of Soil Science awards the annual Normal Taylor Memorial Award for Outstanding Contributions to Soil Science (also called the Norman Taylor Memorial Lecture) in his honour.

References

1900 births
1975 deaths
New Zealand schoolteachers
People from Auckland
New Zealand soil scientists
New Zealand Officers of the Order of the British Empire